The first season of The Twilight Zone aired Fridays at 10:00–10:30 pm (EST) on CBS from October 2, 1959, to July 1, 1960. There are 36 episodes, including the pilot, "Where Is Everybody?" The theme music for this season, written by Bernard Herrmann, is different from the music most commonly associated with the series, written by Marius Constant for the second season onwards.

Intro
The opening intro for most of these episodes features a series of lagoon graphics by UPA, with Rod Serling's narration:

"There is a fifth dimension, beyond that which is known to man. It is a dimension as vast as space and as timeless as infinity. It is the middle ground between light and shadow, between science and superstition, and it lies between the pit of man's fears and the summit of his knowledge. This is the dimension of imagination. It is an area which we call The Twilight Zone."

A different intro was used for the final four episodes, featuring an animated close-up of an eye that metamorphosed into a setting sun and an abridged version of Herrmann's theme music. Serling's narration for this went as follows:

"You are about to enter another dimension. A dimension not only of sight and sound but of mind. A journey into a wondrous land of imagination. Next stop—The Twilight Zone."

The graphics for this opening were by Pacific Title, as were those for the openings in the subsequent seasons.

At least one episode, "Mr. Denton on Doomsday", is known to have had this opening dubbed over the original lagoon opening when it was aired as a summer repeat in 1960. The following summer, a number of first-season episodes had the second season intro dubbed over the original when they were aired as repeats. The original openings have since been restored for those episodes. 

Segments of the original first season intro continued to be used as an intermission graphic up through season three.

Episodes

References

1959 American television seasons
1960 American television seasons
59 series